Péh₂usōn ("Protector") was a proposed Proto-Indo-European pastoral god guarding roads and herds. 

He may have had an unfortunate appearance, a bushy beard and a keen sight. He was also closely affiliated with goats or bucks: Pan has goat's legs while goats are said to pull the car of Pūshān (the animal was also sacrificed to him on occasion).

History   

The deity was first proposed due to association between the Greek god Pan and the Vedic god Pūshān first identified in 1924 by German linguist Hermann Collitz.
 
The minor discrepancies between the two deities could be explained by the possibility that many of Pan's original attributes were transferred over to his father Hermes, the two of which were likely originally the same deity

According to West, the reflex may be at least of Graeco-Aryan origin: "Pūshān and Pan agree well enough in name and nature—especially when Hermes is seen as a hypostasis of Pan—to make it a reasonable conclusion that they are parallel reflexes of a prototypical god of ways and byways, a guide on the journey, a protector of flocks, a watcher of who and what goes where, one who can scamper up any slope with the ease of a goat."

Pan and Hermes 
The earliest form of the name Hermes is the Mycenaean Greek *hermāhās, written  e-ma-a2 (e-ma-ha) in the Linear B syllabic script. Most scholars derive "Hermes" from Greek ἕρμα (herma), "stone heap."

His cult was established in Greece in remote regions, likely making him originally a god of nature, farmers, and shepherds. It is also possible that since the beginning he has been a deity with shamanic attributes linked to divination, reconciliation, magic, sacrifices, and initiation and contact with other planes of existence, a role of mediator between the worlds of the visible and invisible. According to a theory that has received considerable scholarly acceptance, Hermes originated as a form of the god Pan, who has been identified as a reflex of the Proto-Indo-European pastoral god *Péh2usōn, in his aspect as the god of boundary markers. Later, the epithet supplanted the original name itself and Hermes took over the roles as god of messengers, travelers, and boundaries, which had originally belonged to Pan, while Pan himself continued to be venerated by his original name in his more rustic aspect as the god of the wild in the relatively isolated mountainous region of Arcadia. In later myths, after the cult of Pan was reintroduced to Attica, Pan was said to be Hermes's son.

References

Bibliography

 

 
 

Proto-Indo-European deities
Reconstructed words
Proto-Indo-European mythology